Carl Lawrence Husta (April 8, 1902 – November 16, 1951) was an American Major League Baseball infielder. Nicknamed "Sox", he played for the Philadelphia Athletics during the  season.

He died in Kingston, New York, in 1951.

References

External links

1902 births
1951 deaths
Baseball players from New Jersey
Basketball players from New Jersey
Cleveland Rosenblums players
Guards (basketball)
Major League Baseball infielders
Original Celtics players
Philadelphia Athletics players
American men's basketball players
Henderson Gamecocks players